Live '85–'86 is a live album by American deathrock band Samhain. It was first released as part of the Samhain Box Set in a "mini-LP" sleeve in September 2000, then on its own in a jewel case in 2001 with either an orange or a red cover. The initial pressing with the "orange blood" cover is printed slightly off-center, cutting off part of the "86" in the title.

Track listing 

 Tracks 1–10: Live February 19, 1985, at Danceteria, New York City
 Tracks 11–18: Live April 13, 1986, at the Cabaret, Metro Chicago, IL

Personnel 
 Glenn Danzig – vocals
 Eerie Von – bass
 Pete "Damien" Marshall – guitar
 Steve Zing – drums (tracks 1–10)
 London May – drums (tracks 11–18)

References 

Samhain (band) albums
Albums produced by Glenn Danzig
Live horror punk albums
2002 live albums